Brazilian destroyer Pernambuco (D30) may refer to:

  (pennant number D30), the former American  USS Bradley (FF-1041); acquired by the Brazilian Navy in 1989 and classed as a destroyer; decommissioned in 2004 and held in reserve

Brazilian Navy ship names